The 1941–42 Allsvenskan was the eighth season of the top division of Swedish handball. Eight teams competed in the league. Majornas IK won the league, but the title of Swedish Champions was awarded to the winner of Svenska mästerskapet. IFK Kristianstad and IFK Ystad were relegated.

League table

Attendance

References 

Swedish handball competitions